A family seat or sometimes just called seat is the principal residence of the landed gentry and aristocracy. The residence usually denotes the social, economic, political, or historic connection of the family within a given area. Some families took their dynasty name from their family seat (Habsburg, Hohenzollern, and Windsor), or named their family seat after their own dynasty's name. The term family seat was first recorded in the 11th century Domesday Book where it was listed as the word caput. The term continues to be used in the British Isles today. A clan seat refers to the seat of the chief of a Scottish clan.

Examples

List of family seats of English nobility
List of family seats of Irish nobility
List of family seats of Scottish nobility
List of family seats of Welsh nobility

References

Nobility
Peerage
European peerage
 Family seat